Belœil is a municipality of Wallonia located in the province of Hainaut, Belgium. 

It is around 10 km south of Ath. On 1 January 2006 the municipality had 13,347 inhabitants. The total area is 61.55 km², giving a population density of 217 inhabitants per km².

The municipality consists of the following districts: Aubechies, Basècles, Belœil, Ellignies-Sainte-Anne, Grandglise, Quevaucamps, Ramegnies, Stambruges, Thumaide, and Wadelincourt.

The municipality is named after the château of Belœil, once the seat of Charles-Joseph, Prince of Ligne, a military officer and man of letters who corresponded with Jean-Jacques Rousseau and Voltaire.

History
The history of the chateau is nebulous but the original construction of a fort or castle at the site is generally thought to date to the 14th century. This site was the seat of the barons of the Ligne family originating from Ligne in Hainault, a place about 8 kilometres from Beloeil. The earliest recorded baron of the House of Ligne was Fastré de Ligne, signatory to a charter dated 1047 and others of the name mentioned in a charter of Baudouin IV, count of Hainaut, dated to 1123.

Postal history

Post-offices opening dates before 1910:

- Beloeil on 28 June 1858. It used a Distribution postal code 8 with bars (before 1864), and 35 with points before 1874.
- Basècles on 21 April 1862. It used a Distribution postal code 126 with bars (before 1864), and 30 with points before 1874.
- Quevaucamps on 13 March 1876.
- Stambruges on 12 November 1888.
- Ramegnies-Chin on 27 June 1896.

Postal codes in 1969:

- Aubechies 7672   
- Basècles 7660    
- Beloeil 7970   
- Ellignies-Sainte-Anne 7671  
- Quevaucamps 7670   
- Ramegnies 7663    
- Ramegnies-Chin 7721  
- Stambruges 7980     
- Thumaide 7662    
- Wadelincourt 7661

Since at least October 1990:
- 7520 Ramegnies-Chin
- 7970 Beloeil
- 7971 Basècles, Ramegnies, Thumaide, Wadelincourt
- 7972 Aubechies, Ellignies-Sainte-Anne, Quevaucamps
- 7973 Grandglise, Stambruges

Famous inhabitants
Apart from many members of the House of Ligne, living in the castle, other famous people to have lived here include:
 Émilie Dequenne, actress
 Pierre Descamps, politician
 Baron Empain, entrepreneur and Egyptologist

Twin towns

  Maybole, Scotland, UK

References

External links

 Official site of the château

Municipalities of Hainaut (province)